Ethical Theory and Moral Practice is a peer-reviewed academic journal in the field of philosophy, established in 1998 and published five times a year by Springer Science+Business Media. It publishes articles in English, focusing on ethics and related fields. It is edited by A. W. Musschenga and F. R. Heeger.

Abstracting and indexing
The journal is indexed in the following services:

References

External links
Ethical Theory and Moral Practice

Ethics journals
Springer Science+Business Media academic journals
Publications established in 1998
English-language journals
5 times per year journals